Hermione was a 40-gun  of the French Navy launched in 1804 and wrecked in 1808.

Ordered by the Italian Republic as a gift to France under the name République Italienne, she was renamed Hermione on 26 December 1803. She was launched in December 1804.

Under Captain Jean-Michel Mahé, she took part in the capture of the Royal Navy 18-gun sloop-of-war  in May 1805, the Battle of Cape Finisterre on 22 July 1805, the Battle of Trafalgar on 21 October 1805, and Lamellerie's expedition of February–July 1806. In late 1807, she was part of a division under Rear-Admiral François-André Baudin, ferrying troops to Martinique.

Hermione was wrecked in Iroise on 18 August 1808. Her wreck was discovered in 1972.

References

Citations

Sources

 Fonds Marine. Campagnes (opérations ; divisions et stations navales ; missions diverses). Inventaire de la sous-série Marine BB4. Tome deuxième : BB4 1 à 482 (1790–1826) 

Age of Sail frigates of France
Hortense-class frigates
1804 ships
Maritime incidents in 1808
Shipwrecks in the Bay of Biscay